Hisayuki Sasaki (27 November 1964 – 3 January 2013) was a Japanese professional golfer.

Sasaki won three tournaments on the Japan Golf Tour and featured in the top 100 of the Official World Golf Ranking.

Sasaki tied Davis Love III for the individual trophy of the 1995 World Cup of Golf but lost on the fifth hole of a sudden-death playoff.

Sasaki played on the PGA Tour in 1996 but with only three top-25 finishes he failed to maintain his playing rights. He finished third in the 1997 Andersen Consulting World Championship of Golf.

Professional wins (9)

Japan Golf Tour wins (3)

Japan Golf Tour playoff record (0–2)

Japan Challenge Tour wins (3)
1991 Kanto Kokusai Open
1992 Kanto Kokusai Open, Korakuen Cup (2nd)

Other wins (3)
1994 Kanto Open
1999 Kanto Open
2002 Hokkaido Open

Results in major championships

"T" = Tied
Note: Sasaki only played in The Open Championship.

Team appearances
World Cup (representing Japan): 1995

See also
1995 PGA Tour Qualifying School graduates

References

External links

Japanese male golfers
Japan Golf Tour golfers
PGA Tour golfers
Sportspeople from Tokyo
1964 births
2013 deaths